Xu Jiankang (born 1952), or Hoi Kin Hong in Cantonese, is a Chinese billionaire entrepreneur with Macau citizenship, and the chairman of Powerlong, a Fujian-based real estate development company.

Xu was born in 1952 in Jinjiang, Fujian, China. He moved to Macau and founded his first company in 1981. He founded Powerlong in 1990 and developed real estate in his home province Fujian.

Xu is married, with two children. He lives in Shanghai. His son Hoi Wa Fong is the CEO of Powerlong.

References

1952 births
Living people
Billionaires from Fujian
Macau billionaires
Businesspeople from Fujian
People from Jinjiang, Fujian
Chinese company founders
Real estate company founders
Chinese real estate businesspeople